Mitre clamps are designed to hold mitre joints together. The earliest mitre clamps are a simple spring in a C-shape with sharpened points that are sprung onto the outside corner of the mitre joint. The right angled plates are higher than the screws and the red holder. The screws go under the frame (work-piece) to be held, and the red bit clamps down on the lower-edge of the frame. Recent designs are more complicated; a rigid body holds one fixed and one moveable jaw activated by a cam. Examples of the newer clamps are Jim Chestnut's "Clam Clamp" and the Maestro Mitre Clamp.

Woodworking clamps
Woodworking hand tools